Kim Kon-il (born 19 October 1966) is a South Korean sport shooter who competed in the 1988 Summer Olympics and in the 1992 Summer Olympics.

References

1966 births
Living people
South Korean male sport shooters
Trap and double trap shooters
Olympic shooters of South Korea
Shooters at the 1988 Summer Olympics
Shooters at the 1992 Summer Olympics